Alvin Smith may refer to:

Alvin Smith (Bahamian politician) (born 1951), Bahamian politician and Speaker of the Bahamian House of Assembly
Alvin Smith (brother of Joseph Smith) (1798–1823), eldest brother of Joseph Smith, founder of the Latter Day Saint movement
Alvin T. Smith (1802–1888), American politician and pioneer in Oregon

See also
Al Smith (disambiguation)